Andriy Vasylyovych Fedchuk (January 12, 1980 – November 15, 2009), was a boxer from Ukraine, who won the bronze medal in the light heavyweight division (– 81 kg) at the 2000 Summer Olympics in Sydney, Australia. In the semifinals he was defeated by eventual runner-up Rudolf Kraj from the Czech Republic. He also represented his native country at the 2004 Summer Olympics in Athens, Greece, after having won the bronze medal in the same year at the 2004 European Amateur Boxing Championships in Pula, Croatia. He was born in Kolomyia, Ivano-Frankivsk Oblast and, on November 15, 2009 died in a traffic collision near Kolomyia.

Olympic results
Defeated Azziz Raguig (Morocco) RSC 3
Defeated Charles Adamu (Ghana) 13-5
Defeated Gurcharan Singh (India) 12-12 (Fedchuck won the decision)
Lost to Rudolf Kraj (Czech Republic) 7-11

References
 sports-reference.com
 databaseOlympics.com
 NEWSru.ua

1980 births
2009 deaths
Light-heavyweight boxers
Boxers at the 2000 Summer Olympics
Boxers at the 2004 Summer Olympics
Olympic boxers of Ukraine
Olympic bronze medalists for Ukraine
Road incident deaths in Ukraine
Olympic medalists in boxing
People from Kolomyia
Ukrainian male boxers
Medalists at the 2000 Summer Olympics
Sportspeople from Ivano-Frankivsk Oblast